Quique is a male given name in Spanish-speaking countries, often a diminutive form (hypocorism) of Enrique.

Persons
Quique Lucca (1912-2016), Puerto Rican musician
Quique Costas (born 1947), Spanish football defender and manager
Quique Wolff (born 1949), Argentine football defender and journalist
Quique Setién (born 1958), Spanish football midfielder and football manager
Quique Ramos (born 1956), Spanish football defensive midfielder
Quique Hernández (born 1958), Spanish football manager
Quique Sinesi (born 1960), Argentine guitarist
Quique Sánchez Flores (born 1965), Spanish football defender and football manager
Quique Estebaranz (born 1965), Spanish football forward
Quique Medina (born 1967), Spanish football defender and manager
Quique Dacosta (born 1972), Spanish chef
Quique Martín (born 1972), Spanish football forward
Quique González (born 1973), Spanish singer-songwriter
Quique Neira (born 1973), Chilean reggae singer 
Quique Álvarez (born 1975), Spanish football defender
Quique de Lucas (born 1978), Spanish football attacking midfielder
Quique Ortiz (born 1979), Argentine football wing-back
Quique Escamilla (born 1980), Mexican-Canadian folk musician
Quique de la Mata (born 1984), Spanish football midfielder
José "Quique" Rivera (born 1986), Puerto Rican stop-motion animator and filmmaker
Quique Rivero (born 1992), Spanish football midfielder
Quique Fornos (born 1997), Spanish football defender
José Quique Meléndez, Puerto Rican politician
Quique Somenzini, Argentine aircraft pilot

See also 
 
 Quique (disambiguation)
 Enrique (disambiguation)
 Kike (disambiguation)

Spanish masculine given names
Spanish-language hypocorisms